Stanisław Rogalski (25 May 1904 – 6 February 1976) was a Polish aircraft designer, born in Olomouc, best known as one of the founding trio of the inter-war period RWD airplane factory in Warsaw. He obtained his degree at Warsaw University of Technology. During World War II he became technical director at the Turk Hava Kurumu Ucak Fabrikasi factory. In 1949 he moved to the United States, where he ended his career at Grumman as an aerodynamics expert.

References

Polish aerospace engineers
1904 births
1976 deaths
People from Olomouc
Polish emigrants to the United States
Place of birth missing
Place of death missing
Aircraft designers
Aerodynamicists
Warsaw University of Technology alumni